The Dr. Gilbert McKeeby House is a historic house in Red Cloud, Nebraska. It was built in 1883 for Dr. Gilbert McKeeby, a physician from New York City. His friend, author Willa Cather, based the character of Dr. Archie on him in her 1915 novel, The Song of the Lark. The house was designed in the Victorian architectural style, with a Vernacular Greek Revival porch. It has been listed on the National Register of Historic Places since August 11, 1982.

References

		
National Register of Historic Places in Webster County, Nebraska
Greek Revival architecture in Nebraska
Victorian architecture in Nebraska